Daneș in (Hungarian: Dános,) is a commune in Mureș County, Transylvania, Romania, near Sighișoara. It is composed of four villages: Criș, Daneș, Seleuș and Stejărenii (Beșa until 1960).

See also
List of Hungarian exonyms (Mureș County)

Gallery

References

Communes in Mureș County
Localities in Transylvania